WCLN (1170 AM) is a radio station broadcasting an oldies format. Licensed to Clinton, North Carolina, United States.  The station is currently owned by Christian Listening Network, Inc. and features programming from ABC Radio .

History
Larry Carr of Clinton operated WCLN, a daytime-only station, and WCLN-FM prior to the 1991 purchase of the 16-year-old stations by Willis Broadcasting Corp. of Norfolk, Virginia. The stations' format would be adult contemporary music and oldies.

WCLN and WCLN-FM were Christian when the FM station increased its power from 3,000 to 25,000 watts to better cover Fayetteville. Curt Nunnery of WFLB became sales manager.

By 1997, WCLN was airing Southern gospel music separately from the FM, and by 2000, WCLN was playing oldies.

In 2012, WCLN played oldies along with locally oriented programming including Clinton High School sports. The hosts of the morning show can be seen through glass from the outside, as is true for the Today show.

References

External links

Radio stations established in 1975
1975 establishments in North Carolina
CLN
Sampson County, North Carolina